The 46th Filmfare Awards South ceremony honouring the winners and nominees of the best of South Indian cinema in films released 1998, is an event that was held at the Lalitha Kala Thoranam, Public Gardens on 24 April 1999.The awards were distributed at Hyderabad.

Jury

Main awards

Kannada cinema

Malayalam cinema

Tamil cinema

Telugu cinema

Technical Awards

Special awards

Awards Presentation

 Vandemataram Srinivas (Best Playback Singer) Received Award from Mani Ratnam
 Suchitra Chandrabose (Best Choreography) Received Award from Farah Khan
 Thotta Tharani (Best Art Director) Received Award from Neelam Chauhan & Divya Palat
 Isha Koppikar (Best Female Debut) Received Award from M. F. Hussain
 Jaimala (Best Film Kannada) Received Award from V. Madhusudan Rao
 Karunakaran (Best Film Malayalam) Received Award from K. S. Ramarao
 P. Kiran (Best Film Telugu) Received Award from K. Viswanath
 A. M. Rathnam (Best Film Tamil) Received Award from Nagma
 Girish Kasaravalli (Best Director Kannada) Received Award from S. V. Krishna Reddy
 Naveen Vadde Receives Sreenivasan Award (Best Director Malayalam)
 Krishna Vamsi (Best Director Telugu) Received Award from Chiranjeevi
 Cheran (Best Director Tamil) Received Award from D. Rama Naidu
 Hamsalekha (Best Music Director Kannada) Received Award from E. V. V. Satyanarayana
 Vidyasagar (Best Music Director Malayalam) Received Award from D. Suresh Babu
 A. R. Rahman (Best Music Director Tamil) Received Award from Simran
 Mani Sharma (Best Music Director Telugu) Received Award from Kamaal Khan
 Jaimala (Best Actress Kannada) Received Award from Prakash Raj
 Naveen Vadde Receives Manju Warrier Award (Best Actress Malayalam)
 Soundarya (Best Actress Telugu) Received Award from Rekha
 Kausalya (Best Actress Tamil) Received Award from Anupam Kher
 Ramesh Aravind (Best Actor Kannada) Received Award from Aiswarya
 Balachandra Menon (Best Actor Malayalam) Received Award from Khushbu
 Venkatesh (Best Actor Telugu) Received Award from Madhuri Dixit
 R. Sarathkumar (Best Actor Tamil) Received Award from Ramya Krishna
 Ramoji Rao (Special Award) Received Award from A. Madhava Reddy
 Lakshmi (Lifetime Achievement Award) Received Award from N. Chandrababu Naidu & Chiranjeevi
 Allu Ramalingaiah (Lifetime Achievement Award) Received Award from N. Chandrababu Naidu & Chiranjeevi

References

External links
 
 

Filmfare Awards South